The St. Louis Frogs were an American soccer club. The Frogs were owned by Giesler Sports Enterprises and given sanction to enter the American Soccer League's newly-formed Midwest Conference by the United States Soccer Football Association at the 1972, summer meetings in Anchorage. The team played only one season and was coached by Pete Traina, with Walter J. Giesler serving as general manager. Their colors were green and white, and they played their home matches at Giesler's Sports Village.

Team name
In a newspaper interview Giesler stated that the team named stemmed from a cast iron frog that had been found during a remodeling of his sporting goods store. Construction workers told him that it was an old good luck tradition of contractors to place a frog of some sort inside a wall during construction. The frog wound up becoming a decoration on his desk. Originally he had wanted to call the team the Missouri Mules, but the name had already been taken. As he struggled to come up with an original name, he realized the answer was sitting right on his desk, and thus the St. Louis Frogs were born.

Year-by-year

Final conference standings

*Chicago Americans played only a few games

Game-by-game

Friendly results

Regular season results

References

Frogs
Defunct soccer clubs in Missouri
American Soccer League (1933–1983) teams
1972 in sports in Missouri
1972 establishments in Missouri
Association football clubs established in 1972
1972 disestablishments in Missouri
Association football clubs disestablished in 1972